Robert Charles Sproul (February 13, 1939 – December 14, 2017) was an American Reformed theologian and ordained pastor in the Presbyterian Church in America. He was the founder and chairman of Ligonier Ministries (named for the Ligonier Valley just outside Pittsburgh, where the ministry started as a study center for college and seminary students) and could be heard daily on the Renewing Your Mind radio broadcast in the United States and internationally. Under Sproul's direction, Ligonier Ministries produced the Ligonier Statement on Biblical Inerrancy, which would eventually grow into the 1978 Chicago Statement on Biblical Inerrancy, of which Sproul, alongside Norman Geisler, was one of the chief architects. Sproul has been described as "the greatest and most influential proponent of the recovery of Reformed theology in the last century."

Education and personal life 
Sproul was born in Pittsburgh, Pennsylvania, as the second child of Robert Cecil Sproul, an accountant and a veteran of World War II and his wife, Mayre Ann Sproul (née Yardis). Sproul was an avid supporter of the Pittsburgh Steelers and Pittsburgh Pirates as a youth, and at the age of 15, he had to drop out from high school athletics in order to support his family. He obtained degrees from Westminster College, Pennsylvania (BA, 1961), Pittsburgh Theological Seminary (MDiv, 1964), the Free University of Amsterdam (Drs., 1969), and Whitefield Theological Seminary (PhD, 2001). He taught at numerous colleges and seminaries, including Reformed Theological Seminary in Orlando and in Jackson, Mississippi, and Knox Theological Seminary in Ft. Lauderdale.

One of Sproul's mentors was John Gerstner, a professor of his at Pittsburgh-Xenia Theological Seminary. The two of them, along with another of Gerstner's students, Arthur Lindsley, co-authored the book Classical Apologetics in 1984. Sproul's ministry, Ligonier Ministries, made recordings of Gerstner teaching various courses on theology and the Bible.

He married Vesta Voorhis in 1960 and had two children, Sherrie Dorotiak and Robert Craig Sproul.

Sproul was a passenger on the Amtrak train that derailed in the 1993 Big Bayou Canot train wreck, and sometimes gave firsthand accounts of the story.

Career 

Ligonier Ministries hosts several theological conferences each year, including the main conference in Orlando, FL, at which Sproul was one of the primary speakers. Sproul served as co-pastor at Saint Andrew's Chapel, a congregation in Sanford, Florida. He was ordained as an elder in the United Presbyterian Church in the USA in 1965, but left that denomination around 1975 and joined the Presbyterian Church in America. He was also a Council member of the Alliance of Confessing Evangelicals.

Sproul was an advocate of Calvinism in his many print, audio, and video publications, and advocated the Thomistic (classical) approaches to Christian apologetics, less common among Reformed apologists, most of whom prefer presuppositionalism. A dominant theme in his Renewing Your Mind lessons is the holiness and sovereignty of God. Sproul taught that headcovering should be practiced in churches as the ordinance is "rooted and grounded in creation".

Sproul, a staunch critic of the Catholic Church and Catholic theology, denounced the 1994 ecumenical document Evangelicals and Catholics Together.

In 2003, a Festschrift was published in his honor. After Darkness, Light: Essays in Honor of R. C. Sproul included contributions from Robert Godfrey, Sinclair Ferguson, O. Palmer Robertson, Michael Horton, Douglas Wilson, John F. MacArthur, and Jay E. Adams.

Health and death 
On April 18, 2015, Sproul suffered  a stroke and was admitted to a hospital. Five days later, on April 23, Sproul went home from the hospital, suffering no ill effects. He was, however, diagnosed with a diabetic condition "that [would] be addressed through diet and regular medical attention."

A longtime heavy cigarette smoker, Sproul had long suffered from chronic obstructive pulmonary disease, and was hospitalized on December 2, 2017, because of difficulty breathing, the result of an apparent infection, an “exacerbation of his emphysema due to the flu” (“not pneumonia”). After a twelve-day period of intermittent fever, and sedation and ventilator-assisted breathing, with effort given to restore his respiratory function, Sproul died on December 14, 2017 (at age 78).

Publications 
Some of Sproul's best-known books are The Holiness of God, Essential Truths of the Christian Faith, and What Is Reformed Theology? He is also well known for Chosen by God, a book about predestination and the sovereignty of God. His book Not a Chance: The Myth of Chance in Modern Science and Cosmology was highly praised by those who reject the materialism advocated by some in the scientific community.

Through Ligonier Ministries and the Renewing Your Mind radio program and conferences, Sproul generated numerous audio and video lectures on the subjects of history of philosophy, theology, Bible study, apologetics, intelligent design, and Christian living. In addition, Sproul wrote more than 100 books and many articles for evangelical publications. He signed the 1978 Chicago Statement on Biblical Inerrancy, which affirmed the traditional view of Biblical inerrancy, and he wrote a commentary on that document titled Explaining Inerrancy. He also served as the general editor of the Reformation Study Bible, which has appeared in several editions and was also known as the New Geneva Study Bible. In addition, Sproul was executive editor of Tabletalk magazine.

Published books 
 Moses and the Burning Bush (2018) 
 The Legacy of Luther (2016) with Stephen J. Nichols and others 
 The Knight's Map (2016) 
 Everyone's a Theologian: An Introduction to Systematic Theology (2014) 
 The Promises of God (2013) 
 God's Love: How the Infinite God Cares for His Children (2012) 
 Are We Together: A Protestant Analyzes Roman Catholicism (2012) 
 The Work of Christ: What the Events of Jesus Life Mean for You (2012) 
 The Donkey Who Carried a King (2012) 
 The Barber Who Wanted to Pray (2011) 
 Unseen Realities: Heaven, Hell, Angels, and Demons (2011) 
 The Prayer of the Lord (2009) 
 The Prince's Poison Cup (2008) 
 The Truth of the Cross (2007) 
 Truths We Confess: A Layman's Guide to the Westminster Confession of Faith Volume 3: The State, The Family, The Church, and Last Things (2007) 
 Truths We Confess: A Layman's Guide to the Westminster Confession of Faith Volume 2: Salvation and the Christian Life (2007) 
 Truths We Confess: A Layman's Guide to the Westminster Confession of Faith Volume 1: The Triune God (2006) 
 The Lightlings (2006) 
 How Then Shall We Worship? (2006 as A Taste of Heaven; revised 2006) 
 Running the Race: A Graduate's Guide to Life (2003) 
 Defending Your Faith (2003) 
 The Dark Side of Islam (2003) with Abdul Saleeb 
 Five Things Every Christian Needs to Grow (2002) 
 Saved from What? (2002) 
 When Worlds Collide: Where is God? (2002) 
 What's in the Bible? (2001) 
 Loved By God (2001) 
 The Consequence of Ideas (2000) 
 In the Presence of God (1999) 
 Getting the Gospel Right: The Tie That Binds Evangelicals Together (1999) 
 A Walk with God: Luke (1999) 
 The Last Days According to Jesus (1998) 
 What is Reformed Theology (1997 as Grace Unknown; revised 2005) 
 Willing to Believe: Understanding the Role of Human Will in Salvation (1997) 
 The Priest with Dirty Clothes (1997; revised 2011) 
 Now, That's a Good Question! (1996) 
 The Invisible Hand (1996, revised 2003) 
 Choosing My Religion (1996) 
 Ultimate Issues (1996) 
 Before the Face of God Volume 4: A Daily Guide for Living from Ephesians, Hebrews, and James (1996) 
 Reformation Study Bible (1995 as New Geneva Study Bible; revised 1998, 2005, 2015) served as General Editor 
 The Unexpected Jesus (1995 as The Mighty Christ; revised 2005) 
 Faith Alone (1995; revised 2016) 
 The Purpose of God: An Exposition of Ephesians (1994; revised 2006) 
 Not a Chance: God, Science, and the Revolt against Reason (1994; revised 2014) with Keith Mathison 
 Before the Face of God Volume 3: A Daily Guide for Living from the Old Testament (1994) 
 The Gospel of God: An Exposition of Romans (1994 revised 1999) 
 Before the Face of God Volume 2: A Daily Guide for Living from the Gospel of Luke (1993) 
 Doubt and Assurance (1993) 
 The Soul's Quest for God: Satisfying the Hunger for Spiritual Communion With God (1993; revised 2003) 
 Before the Face of God Volume 1: A Daily Guide for Living from the Book of Romans (1992) 
 Essential Truths of Christian Faith (1992) 
 Following Christ (1991)  combination of previously published booklets titled: Who Is Jesus? (1983), Ethics and the Christian (1983), God's Will and the Christian (1984), and Effective Prayer (1984).
 The Mystery of the Holy Spirit (1990; revised 2009) 
 Abortion--A Rational Look at an Emotional Issue (1990; revised 2010) 
 The Glory of Christ (1990; revised 2003) 
 Surprised by Suffering (1989; revised 2009) 
 Pleasing God (1988; revised 2012) 
 Discovering God Who Is (1987 as One Holy Passion; revised 1995 and 2003 as The Character of God and 2008 as Discovering God Who Is) 
 Lifeviews: Make a Christian Impact on Culture and Society (1986) 
 Chosen by God (1986) 
 The Holiness of God (1985; revised 1998) 
 Classical Apologetics (1984) with John Gerstner and Arthur Lindsley 
 Johnny Come Home (1984) 
 The Hunger for Significance (1983 as In Search of Dignity; revised 1991 and 2001) 
 Stronger Than Steel: The Wayne Alderson Story (1980) 
 Reason to Believe (1978 and 1982 as Objections Answered; revised 2016) 
 Knowing Scripture (1978; revised 2016) 
 Soli Deo Gloria (1976) General Editor
 God's Inerrant Word: An International Symposium on the Trustworthiness of Scripture (1974) Contributor
 The Intimate Marriage (1975 as Discovering the Intimate Marriage; revised 1986 and 2003) 
 If There's a God, Why Are There Atheists? (1974 as The Psychology of Atheism; revised 1988, 1997, and 2018) 
 What We Believe: Understanding and Confessing the Apostle's Creed (1973 as The Symbol: An Exposition of the Apostle's Creed; revised 1982 as Basic Training, 1998 as Renewing Your Mind, and 2015 as What We Believe) 

 Crucial Questions series 
 How Can I Be Right with God? (2017) 
 What Can We Know About God? (2017) 
 What Do Jesus' Parables Mean? (2017) 
 Are People Basically Good? (2016) 
 How Can I Be Blessed? (2016) 
 How Should I Think About Money? (2016) 
 Can I Lose My Salvation? (2015) 
 What is the Great Commission (2015) 
 Are These the Last Days? (2014) 
 What Is Repentance? (2014) 
 What Is the Relationship Between Church and State (2014) 
 How Can I Develop a Christian Conscience? (2013) 
 What Is the Lord's Supper? (2013) 
 What Is the Church? (2013) 
 Does God Control Everything? (2012) 
 Who is the Holy Spirit? (2012) 
 Can I Have Joy in My Life? (2012) 
 What Can I Do with My Guilt? (2011) 
 What Is the Trinity? (2011) 
 What Is Baptism? (2011) 
 What Is Faith? (2010) 
 What Does it Mean to Be Born Again? (2010) 
 Can I Be Sure I'm Saved? (2010) 
 Does Prayer Change Things? (1984 as Effective Prayer; revised 2009) 
 Can I Know God's Will? (1984 as God's Will and the Christian; revised 2009) 
 How Should I Live in This World? (1983 as Ethics and the Christian; revised 2009) 
 Can I Trust the Bible? (1980 and 1996 as Explaining Inerrancy: A Commentary; revised 2009) 
 Who Is Jesus? (1983; revised 2009) 

 St. Andrew's Expositional Commentary series 
 Matthew (2013) 
 1-2 Peter (2011) 
 Mark (2011) 
 Acts (2010) 
 Romans (2009) 
 John'' (2009)

References

External links 
 Official Ligonier Ministries website
 Renewing Your Mind Broadcast
 Tabletalk Magazine
 Reformation Trust Publishing
 Reformation Bible College
 Saint Andrew's Chapel
 Monergism – R. C. Sproul biography
 Stephen J. Nichols - R. C. Sproul: A Life

1939 births
2017 deaths
20th-century Calvinist and Reformed theologians
21st-century Calvinist and Reformed theologians
American Calvinist and Reformed theologians
American Christian clergy
American Christian creationists
American Christian theologians
American critics of Islam
American evangelicals
American people of German descent
American Presbyterian ministers
Bible commentators
Cessationism
Christian apologists
Christian critics of Islam
Christian writers
Critics of atheism
Critics of the Catholic Church
Deaths from chronic obstructive pulmonary disease
Pittsburgh Theological Seminary alumni
Presbyterian Church in America ministers
Presbyterians from Florida
Presbyterians from Pennsylvania
Religious leaders from Pittsburgh
Respiratory disease deaths in Florida
Vrije Universiteit Amsterdam alumni
Westminster College (Pennsylvania) alumni
Writers from Orlando, Florida
Writers from Pittsburgh